Kevin Gillespie (born 1972/3) is an Irish priest who since 20 August 2018 serves as Vicar Forane and Administrator of the Roman Catholic Diocese of Raphoe's Cathedral Parish of Conwal and Leck. Having spent much time at the Vatican and worked closely with two Popes (Benedict XVI and Francis), he has been mentioned as a possible future Bishop of Raphoe.

Biography
Gillespie was educated at St Eunan's College. His surname (Gillespie) translates as "Devotee of the Bishop". He is originally from Gaoth Dobhair. The youngest of six children, his eldest sister (Sorcha) visited him each spring during his time in Rome.

Gillespie's ordination came in 1999,  He was posted to the rural parish of Fintown after being ordained. He served there for five years before being appointed to the Cathedral parish in Letterkenny for a further five years. Based in Rome until around 2009, there he worked for the Congregation for the Clergy. He then returned to Ireland and was based at Leitir and Doochary. He arrived at the Cathedral of St Eunan and St Columba around 2012, where he served as Curate.

Gillespie subsequently returned to Rome to study for his doctorate. While there he led the procession of cardinal electorss into the conclave which chose Jorge Mario Bergoglio to succeed Pope Benedict XVI (and with whom Gillespie also worked closely). Gillespie then served as Papal Master of Ceremonies for the new pope. He assisted Francis during his first Easter Sunday Mass at St. Peter's Basilica on 31 March 2013. Photographs included in national and international media showed Gillespie standing to the right of Pope Francis. Gillespie had earlier led Holy Thursday Mass at the Pontifical Irish College in Rome. Gillespie was part of the Papal Delegation accompanying Pope Francis during his visit to the Philippines in January 2015 and was also present when Pope Francis declared Mother Teresa a saint in St. Peter's Square in September 2016. He joined Members of the Colloquium of Anglican and Roman Catholic Canon Lawyers at their May 2017 reunion in Rome, following their establishment by the Pontifical University of Saint Thomas Aquinas (Angelicum), the Centre for Law and Religion at Cardiff University and Duquesne University School of Law. He was also involved in the World Meeting of Families 2018, which coincided with Pope Francis's visit to Ireland. During the COVID-19 pandemic, Gillespie agreed to celebrate weekday morning Mass for the nation on RTÉ Television.

Honours
The Vatican has awarded him the title Monsignor.

References

External links
 Gillespie at the Pontifical Irish College in Rome

1970s births
Living people
21st-century Irish Roman Catholic priests
People educated at St Eunan's College
People from Gweedore